Amy Shell-Gellasch is a mathematician, historian of mathematics, and book author. She has written or edited the books

Algebra in Context: Introductory Algebra from Origins to Applications (with J. B. Thoo, Johns Hopkins University Press, 2015)
In Service to Mathematics: The Life and Work of Mina Rees (Docent Press, 2011)
Mathematical Time Capsules: Historical Modules for the Mathematics Classroom (ed. with Dick Jardine, MAA Notes 77, Mathematical Association of America, 2010)
Hands on History: A Resource for Teaching Mathematics (ed., MAA Notes 72, Mathematical Association of America, 2007)
From Calculus to Computers: Using the Last 200 Years of Mathematics History in the Classroom (ed. with Dick Jardine, MAA Notes 68, Mathematical Association of America, 2005)

Her article "The Spirograph & mathematical models from 19th-century Germany" (Math. Horizons 2015) was selected for inclusion in The Best Writing on Mathematics 2016.

Shell-Gellasch earned a doctorate (D.A.) from the University of Illinois at Chicago in 2000, with a dissertation that became her book on Mina Rees.
She is an associate professor of mathematics at Montgomery College in Maryland.
She has also served as the archivist for the Canadian Society for History and Philosophy of Mathematics.

References

Year of birth missing (living people)
Living people
21st-century women mathematicians
American historians of mathematics
University of Illinois Chicago alumni
21st-century American mathematicians
American women mathematicians
American women historians
21st-century American historians
Montgomery College faculty
American archivists
21st-century American women